Dare Iz a Darkside is the second studio album by American rapper Redman. It was released on November 22, 1994, by Def Jam Recordings. The album debuted at 13 on the US Billboard 200. The album was certified gold by the Recording Industry Association of America (RIAA).

The album cover features Redman buried in the ground up to his neck, a reference to the cover of Funkadelic's 1971 album Maggot Brain. In addition, the song "Cosmic Slop" shares its name with a 1973 Funkadelic album. The album spawned the two singles "Rockafella" & "Can't Wait".

In 2010, Redman told Vibe Magazine that he never performed any songs from Dare Iz A Darkside in recent years - primarily due to the album being made during one of the dark times in his life. The positive reaction to the album stunned Redman, who said "I was doing a lot of drugs on Dare Iz A Darkside. I have chicks that come up to me and say, 'Yo, Dare Iz A Darkside is my favorite fuckin' album, ever.' I swear, I have not played Dare Iz A Darkside damn near since I did it. Seriously! I was so lost, I was so fucked up during that album". However, during his Verzuz battle with fellow rapper Method Man on April 20, 2021, Redman performed "Can't Wait" for the first time since its single release in 1995.

Critical reception

Jason Birchmeier of AllMusic gave the album a mixed review, remarking that producer Erick Sermon, who plays a large role in the production of the album, "isn't up to his usual standards here." Birchmeier also noted Redman's eccentric personality on Darkside in particular may have alienated fans of his earlier work with EPMD. Though when checking the production credits, Erick Sermon is only listed as an executive producer. He was executive producer for 5 of the albums' 16 actual tracks, not including skits. In reality, it was Reggie Noble who handled lead production of the album. The Source gave it 4 stars. It is considered a cult classic by a section of Redman's fans who believed the album showed Redman at his most cynical and hardcore.

Commercial performance
Dare Iz a Darkside debuted at number 13 on the US Billboard 200 chart, and number one on the US Top R&B/Hip-Hop Albums, becoming his first number one on the chart. On January 27, 1995, the album was certified gold by the Recording Industry Association of America (RIAA) for sales of over 500,000 copies. As of October 2009, the album has 587,000 copies in the United States.

Track listing
The cassette version is tinted red.

Personnel
Information taken from Allmusic.
Engineering – Mike Bona, Bob Fudjinski, Dave Greenberg, Bob Morse
Executive Production – Erick Sermon
Mastering – Tony Dawsey
Mixing – Bob Fudjinski, Dave Greenberg, Bob Morse
Narration – Jeff Stewart
Performing – Hurricane G, Keith Murray, Erick Sermon
Photography – Danny Clinch
Production – Reggie Noble, Erick Sermon
Sequencing – Reggie Noble, Jeff Trotter
Vocals – Reggie Noble, Erick Sermon

Charts

Weekly charts

Year-end charts

Singles

Certifications

See also
 List of number-one R&B albums of 1994 (U.S.)

Notes

External links
 
 Dare Iz a Darkside at Discogs

1994 albums
Albums produced by Erick Sermon
Def Jam Recordings albums
Redman (rapper) albums